Bengt Seth Kanteh Hellberg (born 19 August 1995), known as Seth Hellberg, is a professional footballer who plays as a midfielder for IK Brage. Born in Sweden, he represents the Liberia national team.

Personal life
Hellberg was born in Sweden to a Swedish father and a Liberian mother.

International career
In late August 2019, Hellberg was called up by the Liberia national team. Making the debut on 4 September, he became first Swedish-born player to represent Liberia.

References

External links

 (archive)

1995 births
Living people
People with acquired Liberian citizenship
Liberian footballers
Association football midfielders
Liberia international footballers
Liberian people of Swedish descent
Swedish footballers
IF Brommapojkarna players
Syrianska FC players
IK Brage players
Allsvenskan players
Superettan players
Swedish people of Liberian descent
Sportspeople of Liberian descent